Phillip Michael Thomas Araos Maita (born June 30, 1990) is a Chilean footballer. 

He played for Deportes Colchagua.

He was named after Miami Vice actor Philip Michael Thomas.

Honours

Club
Colo-Colo
 Primera División de Chile (1): 2009 Clausura

Colchagua
 Tercera A (1): 2014

References

External links
 
 
 

1988 births
Living people
People from Antofagasta
Chilean footballers
Chilean expatriate footballers
Colo-Colo footballers
Everton de Viña del Mar footballers
Coquimbo Unido footballers
Colo-Colo B footballers
Puerto Montt footballers
A.O. Glyfada players
Deportes Colchagua footballers
Chilean Primera División players
Primera B de Chile players
Segunda División Profesional de Chile players
Chilean expatriate sportspeople in Greece
Expatriate footballers in Greece
Association football forwards